Kenton County is a county located in the northern part of the Commonwealth of Kentucky. As of the 2020 census, the population was 169,064, making it the third most populous county in Kentucky (behind Jefferson County and Fayette County). Its county seats are Covington and Independence. It was, until November 24, 2010, the only county in Kentucky to have two legally recognized county seats. The county was formed in 1840 and is named for Simon Kenton, a frontiersman notable in the early history of the state.

Kenton County, with Boone and Campbell Counties, is part of the Northern Kentucky metro area, and is included in the Cincinnati-Middletown, OH-KY-IN Metropolitan Statistical Area.

History
Kenton County was established on January 29, 1840, from land given by Campbell County. It was named in honor of Simon Kenton, a pioneer of Kentucky.

Geography
The county is located at the confluence of the Licking River and Ohio River, in the outer Bluegrass area of the Bluegrass region of the state.

Adjacent counties
 Hamilton County, Ohio  (north)
 Campbell County  (east)
 Pendleton County  (southeast)
 Grant County  (southwest)
 Boone County  (west)

Major highways

Demographics

As of the census of 2000, there were 151,464 people, 59,444 households, and 39,470 families living in the county. The racial makeup of the county was 93.99% White, 3.84% Black or African American, 0.15% Native American, 0.59% Asian, 0.03% Pacific Islander, 0.41% from other races, and 1.00% from two or more races.  1.10% of the population were Hispanics or Latinos of any race.

There were 59,444 households, out of which 33.40% had children under the age of 18 living with them, 50.10% were married couples living together, 12.10% had a female householder with no husband present, and 33.60% were non-families. 27.80% of all households were made up of individuals, and 9.00% had someone living alone who was 65 years of age or older.  The average household size was 2.52 and the average family size was 3.11.

The age distribution was 26.30% under 18, 9.20% from 18 to 24, 31.90% from 25 to 44, 21.40% from 45 to 64, and 11.10% who were 65 or older.  The median age was 34 years. For every 100 females there were 96.20 males.  For every 100 females age 18 and over, there were 91.90 males.

The median income for a household in the county was $43,906, and the median income for a family was $52,953. Males had a median income of $37,845 versus $27,253 for females. The per capita income for the county was $22,085.  About 7.10% of families and 9.00% of the population were below the poverty line, including 12.00% of those under age 18 and 7.70% of those age 65 or over.

Education

Public schools

Kenton County has five school districts providing education, from the extremely rural southern areas to the highly urbanized north. The districts are:
 Kenton County School District
 Covington Independent Public Schools
 Beechwood Independent School District (serves Fort Mitchell)
 Ludlow Independent Schools
 Erlanger-Elsmere Schools

Private schools
The Catholic educational system is as extensive as the public system.  These schools are operated by the Diocese of Covington's Department of Schools. The Diocese runs 17 schools in Kenton County.

Higher education
Thomas More University is the only institute of higher learning wholly in the county itself. Northern Kentucky University had a Covington campus located at 1401 Dixie Highway until it closed at the end of 2008. NKU's main campus is not far from Kenton County – only about 4 miles from the Licking River. The Kentucky Community and Technical College System also operates the Gateway Community and Technical College. Classes are provided at GCTC locations in Boone County, Covington, Park Hills and Edgewood.

Libraries
Kenton County is served by a county library with branches in Covington, Erlanger, and Independence. The Erlanger Branch has grown to be the busiest branch library in the state of Kentucky.

In 2008, Kenton County Public Library received the highest score of any Kentucky library ranked by Hennen's American Public Library Ratings.

Communities

Cities

 Bromley
 Covington (county seat)
 Crescent Springs
 Crestview Hills
 Edgewood
 Elsmere
 Erlanger
 Fairview
 Fort Mitchell
 Fort Wright
 Independence (county seat)
 Kenton Vale
 Lakeside Park
 Latonia Lakes
 Ludlow
 Park Hills
 Ryland Heights
 Taylor Mill
 Villa Hills
 Walton

Unincorporated communities
 Atwood
 Latonia
 Nicholson
 Visalia

Visalia and Latonia Lakes have been dissolved as cities within Kenton County.

Politics

See also

 National Register of Historic Places listings in Kenton County, Kentucky

References

External links
 Kenton County government

 
Kentucky counties
Kentucky counties on the Ohio River
1840 establishments in Kentucky
Populated places established in 1840